David Paul Fry (born 5 January 1960) is an English former professional football goalkeeper.  Born in Bournemouth, he began his career at Weymouth as an amateur and in January 1977 signed for Crystal Palace. Fry was initially understudy to firstly, John Burridge and then Paul Barron but in the second half of the 1982–83 season, became first-choice goalkeeper after Barron left the club. In July 1983, however, he was transferred to Gillingham and later went on to play for Torquay United.

After that, he moved into non-league football, playing for Cheltenham Town, Fisher Athletic and Yeovil Town in the Football Conference. In April 1991, he scored with a wind assisted drop kick for Yeovil in a 7–2 win in a league game against Slough Town.

References

External links

1960 births
Living people
English footballers
Gillingham F.C. players
Crystal Palace F.C. players
Torquay United F.C. players
Weymouth F.C. players
Fisher Athletic F.C. players
Yeovil Town F.C. players
Cheltenham Town F.C. players
Footballers from Bournemouth
English Football League players
Association football goalkeepers